Hot Shots is a Canadian television drama series, which aired on CBS in the United States in 1986, and CTV in Canada in 1987.

The series, produced by CTV for the CBS Late Night block of crime drama series, starred Dorothy Parke and Booth Savage as Amanda Reed and Jake West, crime journalists for the tabloid magazine Crime World. The cast also included Paul Burke, Clark Johnson, Heather Smith, and Mung Ling.

Only thirteen episodes of the show were produced. Its producers went on to create Diamonds the following year.

Cast
Dorothy Parke as Amanda Reed
Booth Savage as Jason West
Paul Burke as Nicholas Broderick
Clark Johnson as Al Pendleton
Heather Smith as Cleo
Louis Negin as Goldsmith

References

External links
 

CTV Television Network original programming
CBS original programming
1980s Canadian crime drama television series
1986 Canadian television series debuts
1987 Canadian television series endings